The Control Group is a 2014 American science fiction horror film directed by Peter Hurd, starring Brad Dourif, Ross Destiche and Jenna Enemy.

Cast
 Brad Dourif as Dr. Broward
 Ross Destiche as Jack
 Jenna Enemy as Vanessa
 Justen Jones as Grant
 Emily Soto as Anne
 Shane Phillip as Corey
 Monique Candelaria as Heather
 Jerry G. Angelo as Hanson
 Kodi Lane as Jaime
 Larry Laverty as Agent Trapper
 Meisha Johnson as Nurse Lee
 Taso N. Stavrakis as Agent Torrez
 Luce Rains as The Patient
 Ian Pickett as Ian
 Denise Mauer as Mrs. Ramsay
 Dustin Severson as self
 Jamie Cooper as Crow

Release
The film premiered at the Twin Cities Film Fest on 22 October 2012.

Reception
John Townsend of Starburst rated the film 4 stars out of 10, calling it "What could have been an enjoyable, if largely formulaic genre film becomes an increasingly frustrating and tiresome experience as it progresses." Matt Boiselle of Dread Central rated the film 1.5 stars out of 5, writing that "Hurd sets up a nice premise, decent locale, and interesting government cover-up backstory, but it’s ultimately dragged to its demise by a collection of bad acting stances." Mark L. Miller of Ain't It Cool News called it "an ambitious and well intentioned experiment that just isn’t so successful at mixing subgenres and telling an engaging tale."

References

External links
 
 

2014 films
American science fiction horror films
2010s science fiction horror films
2010s American films